Byczyna may refer to the following places in Poland:
Byczyna in Opole Voivodeship (south-west Poland)
Byczyna, Pomeranian Voivodeship (north Poland)
Byczyna, Kuyavian-Pomeranian Voivodeship (north-central Poland)
 Byczyna, a district of Jaworzno